Michael Grain Crandall (born November 29, 1940, in Baton Rouge, Louisiana) is an American mathematician, specializing in differential equations.

Mathematical career 
In 1962 Crandall earned a baccalaureate in engineering physics from University of California, Berkeley, changed to mathematics, earning a master's in 1964 and a PhD in 1965 under Heinz Cordes at Berkeley, with a thesis that solved a problem in celestial mechanics posed by  Carl Ludwig Siegel; the thesis title is Two families of plane solutions of the four body problem. In 1965 he was an instructor at Berkeley, in 1966 an assistant professor at Stanford University and from 1969 at the University of California, Los Angeles (UCLA), where he was a professor from 1973 to 1976. From 1974 to 1984 he was a professor at the Mathematics Research Center at the University of Wisconsin–Madison, from 1984 to 1990 as Hille-Professor of Mathematics. From 1988 until his retirement he was a professor at the University of California, Santa Barbara. Crandall was several times a visiting professor at the University of Paris, where he received an honorary doctorate in 1999. His legacy of contributions contains all but not limited to: Banach solutions in Euclidean spaces, Fourier transforms of planar variables, PDE concepts and iterations for sequence analysis, semigroup transform solutions, differential harmonic study of divergent hyperbole, physical transformations of finite Jacobian entities, unique harmonic populations in convergent contexts, application of abstract existence principles on non-linear contexts, normalized vector sequencing in multi-dimensional parallax geometries, and the mathematical equivalence study of topographical dissimilar nodes using traditional non-linear surfacing theories to produce distinct solutions in the realm of differential multi-variable applications.

Crandall works primarily on partial differential equations, e.g., with bifurcation theory, evolution equations, generation of semigroups of transformations on Banach spaces and the theory of Hamilton–Jacobi equations. With Pierre-Louis Lions he did research on the viscosity solutions of partial differential equations.

In 2000 he was elected a member of the American Academy of Arts and Sciences. In 1999 he received the Leroy P. Steele Prize. In 1974 he was an Invited Lecturer (on "Semigroups of nonlinear equations and evolution equations") at the International Congress of Mathematicians in Vancouver. In 2012 he became a fellow of the American Mathematical Society.

Among his doctoral students are Lawrence C. Evans and Panagiotis E. Souganidis.

References

External links 
 home page Crandall - UCSB Math. Dept.
 Steele Prize to Crandall, pdf-file, Notices AMS (76 kB)

1940 births
Living people
20th-century American mathematicians
21st-century American mathematicians
Mathematical analysts
PDE theorists
Fellows of the American Mathematical Society
University of California, Berkeley alumni
Stanford University faculty
University of California, Los Angeles faculty
University of California, Santa Barbara faculty
University of Wisconsin–Madison faculty